Big Brother All Stars 2013 was the second season of the all-star spin-off of Big Brother and the twelfth season of the format in Bulgaria overall. It was confirmed by Niki Kanchev on October 21 during the fifth live eviction on VIP Brother 5. Followed the same air schedule as in 2012, it commenced on Nova on 18 November 2013, immediately after the VIP Brother 5 finale and lasted for a month, ended on 16 December 2013. It featured housemates from previous seasons of the show, as well as participants from other reality formats such as X Factor, Survivor and The cherry of the cake. Zlatka Dimitrova won with Leonardo Bianchi as the runner-up.

Housemates
9 housemates entered the house on Day 1, including Zlatka D. and Zlatka R. and another one on Day 3.

Eli
Eli Vladkova was a contestant from Big Brother Family. She and her husband Veselin were the winners of the family edition. She entered the house on Day 1 and was the fifth evicted on Day 24.

Kiril
Kiril Valchev "Skalata" ("The Rock") was a contestant from VIP Brother 1 where he finished sixth. He entered the house on Day 1 and was the third evicted on Day 22.

Leonardo

Leonardo Bianchi "Leo" was a contestant from Big Brother 2 where he finished second. He entered the house on Day 1 and finished second in the finale on Day 29.

Lyubomir

Lyubomir Milchev "Dandy" was a contestant from VIP Brother 1. He entered the house on Day 1 and finished third in the finale on Day 29.

Lyudmil
Lyudmil Avgustinov "Jeason Brad Lewis" was a contestant from X Factor 1. He entered the house on Day 1 and was ejected on Day 12. This is the third ejection in the history of the Bulgarian format - after Nayden and Svetlan being ejected from Big Brother 1 in 2004, and Daniel and Danail from Big Brother 4 in 2008.

Magdalena
Magdalena Zhelyazkova "Magi" was a contestant from VIP Brother 2 where she finished sixth. She entered the house on Day 1 and was the fourth evicted on Day 22.

Nedyalko
Nedyalko Lazarov was a contestant from Big Brother 2. He entered the house on Day 1 and was the first evicted on Day 8.

Penka
Penka Georgieva is a Miss Bulgaria 2013 candidate. She entered the house on Day 1 and was the second evicted on Day 15.

Rayna
Rayna Terziyska was a contestant from VIP Brother 1 and VIP Dance where she won. She entered the house on Day 3 and finished fourth in the finale on Day 29.

Stanislav
Stanislav Iliev "Findo" was a contestant from Survivor 2. He entered the house on Day 1 and was the sixth evicted on Day 24.

Zlatka D.
Zlatka Dimitrova is a former Playmate model in the Bulgarian version of Playboy Playmate. She was the first confirmed housemate on October 21 during the fifth live eviction show of VIP Brother 5. She was a contestant in VIP Brother 4. She entered the VIP Brother 5 house on Day 37 and stayed in the house as a guest until the end of the show on Day 63. She became a winner on Day 29.

Zlatka R.
Zlatka Raykova is a former Playmate model in the Bulgarian version of Playboy Playmate. She entered the VIP Brother 5 house on Day 44 and stayed in the house as a guest until the end of the show on Day 63. She was a participant in the reality show Temptation Island in 2007. She finished fifth in the finale on Day 29.

Nominations table

References

External links
 Official website

2013 Bulgarian television seasons
Big Brother (Bulgarian TV series) seasons
2013 Bulgarian television series endings